Oxygonioceras is a genus in the Oncocerid family, Brevicoceratidae, from the Middle Silurian of North America and Europe.

Oxygonioceras, named by Foeste, 1925, has a loosely coiled, dextrally torticonic shell with a rounded dorsum on the inside of the spiral and an angular or subangular venter on the outside; suture with broad lateral lobes and ventral siphuncle with expanded, nummuloidal segments.

Although also torticonically gyroconic—having an out of plane open spiral - Oxygonioceras differs from Naedyceras and closely related genera in that the siphuncle segments are empty, rather than being actinosiphonate.

See also
List of nautiloids

References
Sweet. W. C. 1964.  Nautiloidea-Oncocerida; Treatise on Invertebrate Paleontology, Part K. Geol Soc of America and Univ Kansas press, R.C. Moore (Ed)

Nautiloids
Paleozoic life of Manitoba